Lim Gi-Han (born 20 October 1973) is a former South Korean footballer. He is currently head coach of Daejeon Citizen U-18 team.

Lim graduated from Daegu University. He was selected for the South Korean olympic team (U-23), but didn't participate in the olympic. Lim played for Bucheon SK until 1999, when he retired from playing football. In 2000, he was the coach for Bucheon FC, and from 2003 to 2007 has coach for Daejeon Citizen FC. In 2008, he was appointed as Daejeon Citizen U-18 head coach.

Coaching
 2000–2002: Bucheon FC (Coach)
 2003–2007: Daejeon Citizen (Coach)
 2008–: Daejeon Citizen U-18 (Head coach)

References

External links 

Living people
1973 births
South Korean footballers
Jeju United FC players
K League 1 players
Association football midfielders